The 1st Michigan Infantry Regiment was an infantry regiment that served in the Union Army during the American Civil War.  A Company consisted of the Detroit Light Guard.

Service
The 1st Michigan Infantry was organized at Detroit, Michigan and mustered into Federal service for three months on May 1, 1861. The 1st Michigan was the state's only three-month regiment, raised in response to President Abraham Lincoln's initial call for 75,000 troops in April 1861.

The regiment was mustered out on August 7, 1861.

Commanders
Colonel Orlando B. Willcox
Major Alonzo F. Bidwell

See also
List of Michigan Civil War Units
Michigan in the American Civil War

Notes
Detroit Light Guard of Michigan 1900
Lineage

References

External links
The Civil War Archive

Units and formations of the Union Army from Michigan
Military units and formations established in 1861
1861 establishments in Michigan
Military units and formations disestablished in 1861